Brasil is a surname. It originated from a Portuguese word for the country of Brazil. Notable people with the surname include:

André Brasil (born 1984), Brazilian Paralympic swimmer
Cristiane Brasil (born 1973), Brazilian lawyer and politician
Edgar Brasil (1902–1954), German-born Brazilian cinematographer
Luiz Brasil (born 1954), Brazilian guitarist
Victor Assis Brasil (1945–1981), Brazilian jazz saxophonist
Linda Brasil (born 1973), Brazilian activist and politician

See also
Brazil (surname)

Portuguese-language surnames